Kirkby Shoal is a small shoal area with depths of less than  extending about  westwards and south-southwestwards, about  from the summit of Shirley Island, Windmill Islands, and  northwest of Stonehocker Point, Clark Peninsula.

Discovery and naming
Kirkby Shoal was discovered and charted in 1962 during a hydrographic survey of Newcomb Bay and approaches by d'A.T. Gale, hydrographic surveyor with the Australian National Antarctic Research Expedition (ANARE) on the Thala Dan, led by Phillip Law. It was named by the Antarctic Names Committee of Australia after Sydney L. Kirkby, a surveyor at Mawson Station in 1956 and 1960.

See also
 History of Antarctica
 List of Antarctic expeditions

References

External links
 Australian Antarctic Names and Medals Committee (AANMC)
 Australian Antarctic Gazetteer
 Scientific Committee on Antarctic Research (SCAR)
 PDF Map of the Australian Antarctic Territory
 Mawson Station

Shoals of Antarctica
Landforms of the Southern Ocean
Barrier islands of Antarctica
Windmill Islands